The Marree Man, or Stuart's Giant, is a modern geoglyph discovered in 1998. It appears to depict an Indigenous Australian man hunting with a boomerang or stick. It is just outside the  Woomera Prohibited Area. Although it is one of the largest geoglyphs in the world (arguably second to the Sajama Lines), its origin remains a mystery, with no one claiming responsibility for its creation nor any eye-witness having been found, notwithstanding the scale of the operation required to form the outline on the plateau floor. The description "Stuart's Giant" was used in anonymous faxes sent to media as "Press Releases" in July 1998, in a reference to the explorer John McDouall Stuart. It was discovered fortuitously by a charter pilot in an overflight on 26 June 1998.

Shortly after its discovery, the site was closed by the South Australian government following legal action taken in late July by native title claimants, but flights over the site were not forbidden as native title fell under federal government jurisdiction.

Work

The Marree Man geoglyph depicts a man holding either a woomera (a throwing stick once used to disperse small flocks of birds) or a boomerang (but see Plaque section below).

By December 1998, it had been noted that the outline matched, in reverse, that of the Artemision Zeus bronze raised from the bottom of the Adriatic Sea in 1928.

The image was gradually eroded through natural processes, but because the climate is extremely dry and barren in the region, the image was still visible in 2013. While there is a layer of white chalk material slightly below the red soil, the figure was not defined to this depth.

The creation of Marree Man occurred between 27 May and 12 June 1998.  By comparing images collected on those dates from NASA's Landsat-5 satellite, the desert area where Marree Man was found goes from undisturbed to the completed figure.  See image below:

Left image from 27 May 1998 Right image from 12 June 1998

In August 2016, work was carried out to redefine the geoglyph using a grader assisted by GPS. The work resulted in an outline clearly visible from the air, matching the original. Two decades after its creation it was speculated that the work itself could not have been created without GPS technology, then in its infancy.

Discovery

Trec Smith, a charter pilot flying between Marree and Coober Pedy in the remote north of South Australia, spotted the figure from the air on 26 June 1998. The discovery of the geoglyph fascinated Australians due to its size and the mystery surrounding how it came to be there.

Anonymous press releases
Several anonymous press releases sent to media and local businesses in July and August 1998 led to the suggestion that the Marree Man was created by people from the United States. The releases said "your State of SA", "Queensland Barrier Reef" and mentioned Aborigines "from the local Indigenous Territories", terms not used by Australians. The press releases also mentioned the Great Serpent in Ohio, which is not well known outside the US. It was also conjectured that these features of the press releases may have been red herrings, inserted to provide an illusion of American authorship.

Preservative bottle
On 16 July 1998, it was reported that a small glass jar had been found in a trough freshly dug at the site containing a satellite photo of the Marree Man together with a note bearing a U.S. flag and references to the Branch Davidians and "Stuart's Giant".

Plaque

In honour of the land they once knew. His attainments in these pursuits are extraordinary; a constant source of wonderment and admiration.

which come from Hedley H. Finlayson's 1946 book The Red Centre, in a section describing the hunting of wallabies with throwing sticks and with photographs of hunters without loincloths and other details seen in the "Marree Man". The book deals with hunters of the Pitjantjatjara tribe.

Suggested creator
Bardius Goldberg, a Northern Territory artist who died in 2002 and lived at Alice Springs, has been suggested as the creator of the work. Goldberg, who was known to be interested in creating a work visible from space, refused when questioned to either confirm or deny that he had created the image.

Others have suggested that members of either the Australian Army or American soldiers stationed in Woomera are responsible.

Reactions
Much of the public and media reaction to the discovery of the figure was positive. The Advertiser, the state's only daily newspaper, called for the figure to be made permanent by excavating the outline down to the white chalk layer.

At the time of discovery, the area was part of a Federal Court lawsuit through the National Native Title Tribunal to determine the traditional owners. The area was claimed by both the Arabunna people and the Dieri Mitha who had been in dispute for several years. The Dieri Mitha publicly complained of harm and exploitation of the Dreamtime, calling for the image to be erased and for the artist to be prosecuted. As native title claimants, the Dieri Mitha took legal action to stop charter flights and vehicles visiting the site, prompting the state government to close the area to the public shortly after discovery. The Arabunna replied, through a solicitor, that the area covered points of archaeological interest and that the artist could be prosecuted. In May 2012, the Federal Court handed native title to the Arabunna people.

The artwork was called environmental vandalism by the former Environment Minister, Dorothy Kotz, and graffiti by the South Australian chief of Aboriginal affairs, David Ruthman.

In June 2018, adventurer Dick Smith revealed that he had had a team working on investigating the origins of Marree Man for two years to no avail and was offering a A$5,000 reward for information leading to identifying its creators. The South Australian state government subsequently formally stated that they would not pursue any legal proceedings against the creators if identified.

See also 
Petroglyph
Cerne Abbas Giant
Long Man of Wilmington

References

External links 

View in Google Maps: 
Audio Interviews with Brad Thompson, Marree-based pilot: Centenary of Federation - Connecting the Continent

Geoglyphs
1998 in Australia
Australian folklore
Far North (South Australia)
1998 archaeological discoveries
Land art